James Hepworth (born 10 June 1975) is an English professional golfer.

Hepworth was born in Harrogate, Yorkshire. He turned professional in 1997 and played on the Challenge Tour in 1999–2003, 2005–2006, 2008 and 2011. He earned two wins at that level, at the 2003 American Express Los Encinos Open and the 2006 Apulia San Domenico Grand Final. In both those seasons, he won promotion to the European Tour, for 2004 and 2007 respectively, but was unsuccessful at the higher level.

Professional wins (5)

Challenge Tour wins (2)

1Co-sanctioned by the Tour de las Américas

PGA EuroPro Tour wins (3)

See also
2006 Challenge Tour graduates

References

External links

English male golfers
European Tour golfers
Sportspeople from Harrogate
People from Ilkley
1975 births
Living people